"God Is a DJ" is a song by British group Faithless, written by Maxi Jazz, Rollo, Sister Bliss, and Jamie Catto. It was released on 24 August 1998 as the lead single from their second studio album, Sunday 8PM (1998). The single reached number six in the United Kingdom and also reached number one on the US Billboard Hot Dance Club Play chart in September 1998. The title and core lyric originated from words on a T-shirt worn to rehearsal by the band guitarist Dave Randall.

Faithless won a Brit Award for Best British Act in 1999 for their work on the song and other tracks on Sunday 8PM. Billboard claimed in an article in early 1999 that many people involved with dance music thought that "God Is a DJ" should have been nominated for a Grammy Award for Best Recording of 1998. The song re-entered the UK chart in 2005 following the release of Forever Faithless and reached number 66.  After Maxi Jazz died in December 2022, the song charted at number 40 on the UK Singles Downloads Chart.

Critical reception
Larry Flick from Billboard wrote that Faithless are "melding electronic elements into a trance-disco beat." He noted further that vocalist Maxi Jazz "strides atop the track with a hypnotic chant that boldly declares the club a church. As he rants "this is my church," organ lines swoop and surround him as the beat pumps with intense authority." Daily Record described it as a "pumping, hypnotic track".

Track listings

UK CD release
 "God Is a DJ" (radio edit) – 03:34
 "God Is a DJ" (Monster mix) [edit] – 06:52
 "God Is a DJ" (Serious Danger remix) [edit] – 05:09
 "God Is a DJ" (Sharp remix) [edit] – 04:27

European CD release
 "God Is a DJ" (radio edit) – 03:33
 "God Is a DJ" (Monster mix) [edit] – 06:53
 "God Is a DJ" (Serious Danger remix) [edit] – 05:09
 "God Is a DJ" (Sharp remix) [edit] – 04:26

French CD release
 "God Is a DJ" (radio mix) – 03:32
 "God Is a DJ" (Sharp remix) – 04:26

Greek CD release
 "God Is a DJ" (radio edit) – 03:33
 "God Is a DJ" (Monster mix) – 06:53
 "God Is a DJ" (Serious Danger remix) – 05:09
 "God Is a DJ" (Sharp remix) – 04:26

12-inch release
 "God Is a DJ" (Monster mix) – 08:01
 "God Is a DJ" (Sharp remix) – 09:21

Charts

Weekly charts

Year-end charts

Certifications

Release history

See also
 List of number-one dance singles of 1998 (U.S.)

References

External links
 FaithlessWeb.com
 Faithless / Rollo / Sister Bliss & related artists - Unofficial Discography

1998 songs
1998 singles
Arista Records singles
Cheeky Records singles
Dutch Top 40 number-one singles
Faithless songs
Songs written by Maxi Jazz
Songs written by Rollo Armstrong
Songs written by Sister Bliss